
Year 625 (DCXXV) was a common year starting on Tuesday (link will display the full calendar) of the Julian calendar. The denomination 625 for this year has been used since the early medieval period, when the Anno Domini calendar era became the prevalent method in Europe for naming years.

Events 
 By place 

 Byzantine Empire 
 Byzantine–Sassanid War: Emperor Heraclius marches with his forces westward, through the mountains of Corduene. In less than seven days, he bypasses Mount Ararat and captures the strategic fortresses  of Amida along the Arsanias River, and Martyropolis on the upper Tigris. The Persian army in northern Mesopotamia withdraws westward across the Euphrates. Heraclius pursues into Cilicia, accompanied by a great train of booty. 
 Battle of Sarus: Heraclius is victorious in a Byzantine assault river crossing. The reinforced Persians under Shahrbaraz are defeated along the Sarus River, near Adana (modern Turkey). Heraclius recaptures Cappadocia and Pontus, and returns to Trapezus to spend the winter. Shahrbaraz retreats in good order, and is able to continue his advance through Asia Minor towards Constantinople.

 Britain 
 King Edwin of Northumbria marries Æthelburga of Kent. As a Christian, she brings her personal chaplain, Paulinus, and encourages her husband to convert to Christianity.
 King Cadfan of Gwynedd dies and is buried at Llangadwaladr, where his memorial stone can still be seen. He is succeeded by his son Cadwallon (approximate date).
 Judicaël becomes high king of Domnonée (northern Brittany).

 Asia 
 King Pulakeshin II of Chalukya receives Persian envoys, who are sent by King Khosrau II at Badami (southern India).

 By topic 

 Religion 
 March 19 – Battle of Uhud: Muhammad retreats against the inhabitants of Mecca (Saudi Arabia), which they consider a victory.
 October 25 – Pope Boniface V dies at Rome after a 6-year reign. He is succeeded by Honorius I as the 70th pope.

Births 
 Hasan ibn Ali, grandson of Muhammad (d. 670)
 Œthelwald, king of Deira (approximate date)
 Theodo II, duke of Bavaria (approximate date) 
 Zhang Jianzhi, official of the Tang Dynasty (d. 706)

Deaths 
 October 25 – Pope Boniface V
 Abd-Allah ibn Jahsh, Arab sahabah
 Hamza ibn abdul-muttalib, Arab sahabah
 Cadfan ap Iago, king of Gwynedd

References

Sources